Laußig is a municipality in the district of Nordsachsen, in Saxony, Germany.

References 

Nordsachsen